Ramsbottom Cricket Club is a cricket club in the Lancashire League, which plays its home games at Acre Bottom in Ramsbottom. The club has won the league on four occasions and won the cup 6 times, including two victories in consecutive years in 2001 and 2002. It has employed professionals including Wasim Raja, Keith Arthurton and Brad Hodge.

Honours
1st XI League Winners - 6 - 1921, 1925, 1974, 1992, 2010, 2016
Worsley Cup Winners - 8 - 1939, 1957, 1996, 2001, 2002, 2005, 2009, 2011
20/20 Cup - 3 - 2010, 2011, 2012
Ron Singleton Colne Trophy Winners - 5 - 1997, 2006, 2010, 2011, 2012 (shared)
2nd XI League Winners - 11 - 1910, 1935, 1964, 1966, 1970, 1972, 1973, 2001, 2006, 2007, 2013
2nd XI (Lancashire Telegraph) Cup Winners - 12 - 1972, 1975, 1987, 1993, 1995, 2002, 2003, 2005, 2006, 2007, 2011, 2015
3rd XI League Winners - 4 - 1995, 1998, 1999, 2000

References

External links
Official site
Ramsbottom CC at lancashireleague.com
Junior Foundation

Lancashire League cricket clubs
Sport in the Borough of Rossendale
Ramsbottom